Hammer SpVg is a German association football club from the city of Hamm, North Rhine-Westphalia. It is part of a larger sports club with some 1,500 members in departments for aikido, judo, cheerleading, fitness and dance, gymnastics, handball, roller hockey, volleyball, and water gymnastics.

History
The club was founded 11 April 1903 as Hammer FC and was joined in July 1912 by the membership of Gymnasialer FC Hamm which had been established 25 February 1903. In 1919, following World War I, the club merged with Hammer Turnverein 1859 to form TuS 1859/1903 Hamm. That union lasted only until 1922, when FC found a new partner in Hammer Sportverein 1904 to create Hammer SpVgg 03/04. The combined side soon began to enjoy some success in play in the regional top flight Rheinisch Westfälischer Spielverband. The club earned a second-place finish in 1929 and a divisional title in 1932.

Generally a lower division local side throughout its history, the club rose as high as third division play with a single season appearance in the Regionalliga West in 1966–67. After competing in the Verbandsliga Westfalen (IV-V) through the late-60s and the 70s Hamm won its way through to the Oberliga Westfalen (IV) in 1980 where they played there as a lower table side until being relegated in 1990. The club made German Cup appearances in 1980–81 and 1982–83, on both occasions advancing to the second round before going out. They returned to fourth division play in 1994 until being sent down in 1999. Hammer SpVg is again competing in the Oberliga Westfalen after emerging out of the Verbandsliga playoffs in 2006.

The club became part of the new NRW-Liga in 2008 but was relegated to the Westfalenliga in 2010. When the Oberliga Westfalen was reformed in 2012 Hammer SpVg became part of this league again.

Honours
The club's honours:
as Hammer SV
 Westphalia champions: 1920

as Hammer SpVg
 Verbandsliga Westfalen
 Champions: 1966, 1980, 1993, 2006

External links
Official team site
Das deutsche Fußball-Archiv historical German football league tables (in German)

Football clubs in Germany
Hamm
Football clubs in North Rhine-Westphalia
Association football clubs established in 1903
1903 establishments in Germany